Figure skating was contested at the 2003 Winter Universiade. Skaters competed in the disciplines of men's singles, ladies' singles, pair skating, and ice dancing.

Results

Men

Ladies

Pairs

Ice dancing

External links
 2003 Winter Universiade results

2003
Winter Universiade
2003 Winter Universiade
International figure skating competitions hosted by Italy